Zhuravlikha is a rural locality (a village) in Razdolyevskoye Rural Settlement, Kolchuginsky District, Vladimir Oblast, Russia. The population was 7 as of 2010.

Geography 
Zhuravlikha is located on the Pazha River, 7 km southeast of Kolchugino (the district's administrative centre) by road. Nikolayevka is the nearest rural locality.

References 

Rural localities in Kolchuginsky District